Aeroflot Flight 04 ( Reys 04 Aeroflota) was a scheduled domestic passenger flight from Khabarovsk to Moscow with a stopover in Irkutsk that crashed on 15 August 1958, killing all 64 passengers and crew aboard the aircraft.  It was the first fatal accident involving a Tupolev Tu-104.

Aircraft 
The aircraft involved in the accident was a Tupolev Tu-104A equipped with two Mikulin AM-3M engines registered as СССР-L5442 to the Moscow Civil Aviation Directorate of Aeroflot, the national flag carrier. At the time of the accident, the aircraft had endured 1041 flight hours and 401 pressurization cycles.

Synopsis 
The weather forecast received by the crew for the Khabarovsk-Irkutsk route stated that cumulonimbus and stratiform clouds were present between altitudes of 300–600 meters at Khabarovsk airport, and thunderstorms with rain were present in the Birobidzhan - Magdagachi area.  Visibility ranged from 4 to 10 kilometers.  The departure from Khabarovsk airport was delayed by 3 hours and 35 minutes, with the passengers and crew not boarding the aircraft until 21:45 local time (14:45 Moscow time).

After flying  en route, the flight encountered towering cumulus clouds with tops too high to safely fly above them. After receiving permission from the controller the crew avoided the clouds before changing altitude as directed by the air traffic controller.

The flight crew stated they saw intense cumulus clouds ahead and would return to Khabarovsk if they could not avoid the clouds. At 22:18 the controller contacted Flight 4 but an agitated voice only replied "one minute, one minute". The second attempt at communications at 22:19 was met with the same response, but Flight 4 did not respond to any later calls. All 64 people on board were killed in the crash.

Investigation 
Investigation showed that the aircraft remained intact until it crashed into the forest, ruling out a decompression. The weight of the Tu-104 at takeoff was 66 tons, which limited the maximum safe altitude for flight to be  at standard engine power; altitudes of  could only be safely achieved by the Tu-104 in calm weather. In attempts to avoid the clouds the airliner increased altitude to levels unsafe for the aircraft at the current weight, and combined with the updrafts present in the clouds, the aircraft stalled, during which the  engines flamed out and the landing gear was extended. The failure of the engines and disorientation of the crew, from accompanied failure of the artificial horizons, rendered recovery nearly impossible.

Secondary causes of the accident were cited as follows:
 Failure of the air traffic controllers and the pilot in command to thoroughly analyse weather conditions at the time, causing the flight to fly into dangerous weather in violation of the flight manual.
 The three hour and 35 minutes delay of the departure of the flight from Khabarovsk, during which weather conditions deteriorated considerably.
 Insufficient preparation for departure on part of the navigators.
 The weather forecast provided to the flight crew did not specify the maximum altitude of the clouds.
 There were no clear indicators for the maximum safe altitude of the Tu-104 with the given takeoff weight.
 There were no defined procedures in place in the event of a stall.
Later accidents demonstrated that when a Tu-104 flew in certain atmospheric conditions, both clear weather and near thunderstorms, the aircraft was prone to losing longitudinal stability, that could be followed by the landing gear dropping, engine failure, and artificial horizon failure.  At the time, the issues with the Tu-104's low stall speed facilitated by weak mechanization of the wing and the other mechanical issues mentioned were not well known.

References  

Aviation accidents and incidents in 1958
Aviation accidents and incidents in the Soviet Union
4
1958 in the Soviet Union
Accidents and incidents involving the Tupolev Tu-104
August 1958 events in Asia
Airliner accidents and incidents caused by pilot error
Airliner accidents and incidents caused by engine failure
Airliner accidents and incidents caused by design or manufacturing errors
Transport in Khabarovsk Krai